Wild Dog (released March 16, 2012 in Oslo, Norway) is the seventh album by Susanna, also known as Susanna and the Magical Orchestra, released on the label SusannaSonata (SONATALP004) / Rune Grammofon (RCD 2128).

Background 
The seventh album release by Susanna is a series of original songs, and here she prove herself as an original songwriter with a strong signature. Chicago Reader critique Peter Margasak, in his review Wild Dog states:

Critical reception 
The AllMusic reviewer Heather Phares awarded the album 4 stars, The Guardian reviewer John Fordham awarded the album 4 stars, and the reviewer Kim Klev of NRK Lydverket awarded the album dice 5.

Track listing 
(All music and lyrics by Susanna)
 "Imagine" (4:00)
 "Freeze" (2:59)
 "Rolling on Rolling Stone" (3:34)
 "Oh, I Am Stuck" (3:33)
 "Starving Soul" (3:50)
 "Invitation" (2:56)
 "Wild Horse Wild Dog"	4:03)
 "There Is Nothing Funny About This" (2:19)
 "Her Eyes" (4:51)
 "Lonely Heart" (2:54)

Musicians 
Susanna Wallumrød - Vocals
Emmett Kelly - Guitars & Vocals
Shahzad Ismaily - Bass Guitar
Jeremy Gara - Drums

Additional musicians
Jo Berger Myhre - Double Bass (track 3), Bass Guitar  (track 7)
Helge Sten - Performer 'Space And Beyond' (track 3)
Kari Rønnekleiv - Violin (track 6)
Ole Henrik Moe - Violin, Viola & Musical Saw (track 6)

Credits 
Produced by Deathprod & Susanna
Mixed & mastered by Helge Sten
Recorded by Janne Hansson at Atlantis Studio
Recorded by Eyvinn Magnus Solberg, Helge Sten & Henning Svoren at Ocean Sound Recordings
Recorded by  Helge Sten & Susanna K Wallumrød at Virus Lab
Sleeve by Kim Hiorthøy

References

External links 
Susanna Official Website
Susanna 'Wild Horse Wild Dog' on YouTube

2012 albums
Susanna Wallumrød albums